Timothy Michael Corcoran (born March 19, 1953), is an American former professional baseball utility player who played in Major League Baseball (MLB) for the Tigers (–), Minnesota Twins, Philadelphia Phillies (–), and New York Mets. Over the course of his 9-year big league career, Corcoran played at first base (183 games), outfield (174 games), and designated hitter (14 games).

Born in Glendale, California, Corcoran attended Northview High School in Covina, California then California State University, Los Angeles (the "Golden Eagles"). He was signed by the Detroit Tigers, in 1974, as an undrafted amateur free agent.

Corcoran’s career MLB statistical totals include 509 games played, a career batting average of .270, and a .349 on-base percentage. Additionally, he complied 373 total bases, 283 hits, 120 runs scored, 128 runs batted in (RBI), 46 doubles, and 12 home runs.

Corcoran's best season was 1980, when he posted a .288 batting average, .379 on-base percentage, and .405 slugging percentage.

References

External links

Tim Corcoran at SABR (Baseball BioProject)
Tim Corcoran at Baseball Almanac
Tim Corcoran at Baseball Gauge
Tim Corcoran at Pura Pelota (Venezuelan Professional Baseball League)

1953 births
Living people
Anaheim Angels scouts
Baseball players from California
Bristol Tigers players
California State University, Los Angeles alumni
Detroit Tigers players
Evansville Triplets players
Lakeland Tigers players
Leones del Caracas players
American expatriate baseball players in Venezuela
Los Angeles Angels scouts
Los Angeles Angels of Anaheim scouts
Maine Guides players
Maine Phillies players
Major League Baseball first basemen
Major League Baseball outfielders
Minnesota Twins players
Montgomery Rebels players
New York Mets players
Oakland Athletics scouts
Oklahoma City 89ers players
Philadelphia Phillies players
Portland Beavers players
Sportspeople from Glendale, California
Tidewater Tides players
Tigres de Aragua players
Mt. SAC Mounties baseball players
Cal State Los Angeles Golden Eagles baseball players
Anchorage Glacier Pilots players